Dulcie Mary Pillers  (17 August 18912 December 1961) was an English medical illustrator and a founding member of the Medical Artists' Association of Great Britain (MAA). The daughter of a Bristol solicitor, she completed her art training at Kensington Government School of Art, Berkeley Square, Clifton, Bristol, graduating in September 1911 with an Art Class Teachers' Certificate.

At the end of World War I, she was a medical illustrator to Ernest William HeyGroves, a wellknown orthopaedic surgeon, at Beaufort War Hospital, a military orthopaedic centre in Stapleton, Bristol. After the armistice, she completed numerous pen and watercolour illustrations of operations at the Ministry of Pensions Hospital, Bath, and Southmead Hospital, Westbury-on-Trym. She also produced illustrations for papers written by medical colleagues at Bristol General Hospital. 

In the 1920s, she was a member of the Bristol Venture Club, one of the first women's classification clubs. She was also a good amateur golfer and a member of the Bristol and Clifton golf club. In later life, she lived with her mother and sister, Irene Dorothy, a former inspector for the Board of Trade. She died at a nursing home in Stoke Bishop, Bristol, close to Sneyd Park. In 1989, her artwork, including ink drawings and colour illustrations of orthopaedic surgery, was exhibited at the British Orthopaedic Association conference. In 2013, her niece donated her artwork to the Royal College of Surgeons of England.

Early life 
Dulcie Mary was born on 17August 1891, at Glen Gariff, Chesterfield Road, StAndrew's, Bristol, the second daughter of Ernest James Pillers and Elizabeth Scott, . Elizabeth Scott was the daughter of Robert Barrett Webb, a former partner in Laverton & Co, furnishers and upholsterers, at Corn Street and Mary le Port Street in Bristol. Ernest James was a Bristol solicitor and the son of a hop merchant. They had married on 4September 1889 at St Werburgh's Church, Bristol.

Pillers' father had a troubled career as a solicitor in Bristol. In 1898, he was charged with forging shares in the Fishponds and Bedminster Brick and Tile Company and obtaining transfer deeds by false pretences, though the case was settled the following year. In 1905, his firm at StStephen's Chambers, Baldwin Street, Bristol, was embezzled by a shorthand clerk. Subsequently, on 15March 1905, a creditor petitioned for bankruptcy, and he was made bankrupt on 19May 1905. He had been suffering from a long and painful illness, and for this reason, his public examination on 2June 1905 was postponed. His funeral was held at Arnos Vale Cemetery in the afternoon of the 7June 1905.

After her father's death, the family moved from Withleigh Road to live with Pillers' maternal grandparents, the Webbs, at 20Belgrave Road, Tyndalls Park. In 1906, Pillers began corresponding with the "Children's Corner" section in the Bristol Times and Mirror, that was edited by Florence Beatrice Hawkins, néeBird. She entered the puzzle and painting competitions in that section, coming second in March 1907 for her "charming watercolour seascape, with softly coloured cliffs and brown rocks; also another clever painting of three kittens, and a third of a bunch of violets."

Pillers' younger brother, Robert Kingsley, would also enter the newspaper competitions. He was educated at the Merchant Venturers' technical college, gaining a scholarship to study automotive engineering at the University of Bristol. He worked for Morgan and Wood, automobile engineers at 7 Unity Street, Bristol, before being calledup to the Northamptonshire Regiment at the start of World War I. He made the rank of lieutenant colonel and was appointed an OBE in the 1919 New Year Honours. In World War II, he served as an educational officer in the Royal Air Force Educational Service, and was given the honorary (and matching) rank of wing commander.

Pillers' elder sister, Irene Dorothy, was an inspector for the Board of Trade. She was educated at Fairfield College for Girls, Apsley Road, Clifton, Bristol, and Skerry's College, 88, Park Street, Bristol, where in July 1920, she passed civil service entrance examinations, coming twelfth out of six hundred candidates. In the 1930s, she was a member of the SouthWestern and Wales regional branch of the Council of Women Civil Servants. In 1951, she joined the Bristol and Gloucestershire Archaeological Society, and later, moved to The Plain, Nympsfield, near Stroud, Gloucestershire. She was elected to the Royal Archaeological Institute in 1961.

Education 

Pillers was educated at Kensington Government School of Art, known occasionally as "Kensington House School of Art", 31Berkeley Square, Clifton, Bristol. The school was founded in 1890 by John Fisher, with the objective of providing a grounding in drawing, sculpture, and design, for professional artists, designers, craftsmen, and art teachers. The school offered courses in artistic anatomy, architecture, decorative design, modelling, figure composition, and painting. There was also an annual exhibition of students' work. William Stuart Vernon Stock, an anaesthetist at the 2nd Southern General Hospital in 1908, was honorary lecturer in anatomy at the school.

Pillers took courses in:

She graduated from the school in September 1911, aged , with an Art Class Teachers' Certificate. At the end of July 1914, the school closed and moved to new premises at Broad Weir, Bristol, to form the Municipal School of Industrial Art. In December 1921, John Fisher retired through ill health, and a year later, the school was closed permanently because of dwindling pupil numbers and escalating costs.

Career 

By 1918, Pillers was employed as a secretary and medical illustrator to Ernest William HeyGroves, a wellknown orthopaedic surgeon. He was commissioned captain in the Royal Army Medical Corps in World War I, serving for a year at the surgical division of a general hospital in Alexandria, Egypt. In 1917, Sir Robert Jones, Inspector of Military Orthopaedics, recommended that he take charge of the military orthopaedic centre at Beaufort War Hospital in Stapleton, Bristol. The war was one of the most destructive conflicts in human history, leaving over 750thousand British troops dead with 1.6million injured, the majority with orthopaedic injuries. At least half the patients arriving at Beaufort had compound fractures caused by shrapnel and gunshot wounds. HeyGroves experimented with grafts and pins to stabilise the fractures and used medical illustrators to record the operations. At the time, photography was unable show enough detail of the interior of the body to be of use to surgeons. Conversely, photography was used extensively for medical records, slides, and book illustration.

HeyGroves wrote several standard textbooks on surgery for students and nurses, but before 1915, they contained few illustrations. His 1915 book, was illustrated by Lucy Marion Joll, known as Marion Joll, the younger sister of Cecil Augustus Joll, who had proofread the book. From January 1916, Cecil Gwendolen StLeger Russell worked with HeyGroves at Beaufort and Southmead Hospital as a "surgical draughtswoman", illustrating his 1918 paper on the treatment of gunshot injuries to bone. Pillers, with Russell, illustrated HeyGroves's first postarmistice paper, "", published in the January 1919 edition of the British Journal of Surgery. In December 1918, Russell married Niel Charles Trew, an American physician, born in Toronto, who had worked at Beaufort during the war. In March 1919, the Trews left Bristol for New York, and in consequence, Pillers became the sole medical illustrator to HeyGroves.

After the war, Pillers completed numerous pen and watercolour illustrations of bonegrafting operations. In 1920, with Alexander Kirkpatrick Maxwell, she illustrated Arthur Rendle Short's book on physiology. She contributed to a number of papers on rheumatic and coronary artery diseases by Carey Coombs, including the 1926 Long Fox Memorial Lecture. In 1933, HeyGroves retired from the consulting staff of Bristol General Hospital and the University of Bristol medical school. In the same year, Percy Phillips was appointed medical superintendent of Southmead Hospital, with Pillers also working there. She continued to contribute to her colleague's medical papers, including sketches of bone crosssections, that exhibited the typical features of renal rickets.

In 1945, the book was updated and edited by Sir Cecil Wakeley, with Pillers contributing new illustrations, and republished as the twelfth edition. On 2April 1949, she attended the founding meeting of the Medical Artists' Association of Great Britain at Nunnery Close, Upper Wolvercote, Oxford, the then home of Audrey Arnott and Margaret McLarty. Also present, amongst others, were Zita Blackburn and Dorothy Davison, elected honorary secretary and treasurer respectively, and David Tompsett, assistant prosector at the Royal College of Surgeons of England, who was elected chairman. At the following meeting in July 1950, it was agreed that those who had attended the first meeting would become founding members of the association.

Personal life 
In the 1920s, Pillers joined the Bristol Venture Club, one of the first women's classification clubs, as an "anatomical artist". She was an active participant in the club's membership committee and charitable activities. However, in 1930, the club merged with the Soroptimist volunteer movement, and she allowed her membership to lapse. In the 1930s, she lived at 24Goldney Road in Clifton, and along with HeyGroves, was a member of the Bristol and Clifton golf club. She won a number of club medals at monthly competitions, off an improving handicap of 25.

Pillers' home at Goldney Road was damaged during the Bristol Blitz, and by July 1941, she had moved to Kimbolton House, 2Mount Beacon in Lansdown, Bath, close to the then Lansdown Grove Hospital, and now known as Haygarth Court. In 1943, she returned to Clifton to live with her sister at Eaton Villa in Clifton Down. She never married; ninepercent of all British men under the age of fortyfive died during World War I. While many women remained unmarried due to the lack of available men, some women in this period remained single by choice or by financial necessity. Furthermore, careers such as medicine were opening up to women, but only if they remained unmarried.

Death and legacy 

Her estate was administered by her niece, Elizabeth Mary Marrian (known as "Biddy"), néeKingsley Pillers, the only child of Pillers' brother, Robert Kingsley. Marrian was a qualified doctor, a former research fellow at the Memorial Sloan Kettering Cancer Center, and until her retirement, director of medical studies at Girton College, Cambridge.

In 1989, Pillers' artwork, including ink drawings and colour illustrations of orthopaedic surgery, was exhibited at the British Orthopaedic Association conference. In 2013, Marrian donated around twentyfive illustrations by Pillers to the archives of the Royal College of Surgeons of England. In February 2015, Gordon Bannister, professor of orthopaedic surgery at the University of Bristol, presented a further seventyfive illustrations to the same archives. In the same year, her life and career was chronicled by Samuel Alberti , then director of museums and archives at the Royal College of Surgeons of England (which includes the Hunterian Museum). On 11March 2015, he presented this research to the Royal College of Physicians of Edinburgh, as part of a series of seminars organised by the Edinburgh History of Medicine Group. In May 2015, he made a related presentation of her work to the Hunterian Society, at the Medical Society of London, entitled Watercolour, Woodcut and Wax: Medical Illustrations since Hunter.

Publications

As medical illustrator

Publications detail

Adams

Coates and Coombs

Coombs

Coombs and Hadfield

Critchley

Davis and Phillips

Griffiths

Herson and Sampson

Hey Groves

Hey Groves, Fortescue‑Brickdale, and Nixon

Hill

Jackman

Jones and Hey Groves

Kyle

Mowat

Norgate

Price and Davie

Ratliff

Short

Wood

See also

Footnotes

References

Further reading 

 
 
 
 
  Includes an illustration by Pillers of a bone graft operation conducted by Hey Groves at Bristol General Hospital.

External links 
 The Pillers and Hey Groves collection at the Royal College of Surgeons of England Online Catalogue (Surgicat).
 Watercolour illustration of a bone graft operation, by Pillers, to repair the fractured radius of Private Humphries. The operation was conducted by HeyGroves and took place at Ward 8, Southmead Hospital, on 19June 1919.
 Doctors and surgeons at the Beaufort War Hospital in 1918, in the collections of the Glenside Museum. Pillers (front, second right), is photographed with HeyGroves (front, centre), and Cecil Gwendolen StLeger Russell (front, second left). Russell's first husband, Niel Charles Trew, is also pictured (back, first left).
 Watercolour, Woodcut and Wax, medical illustration around 1900, as part of the Edinburgh History of Medicine Group seminar series. Presented by Samuel Alberti , to the Royal College of Physicians of Edinburgh, 9 Queen Street, Edinburgh, on 11 March 2015. Pillers' work is discussed in the video of the presentation at 32 minutes 34 seconds.
  of the Medical Artists' Association of Great Britain.

1891 births
1961 deaths
20th-century British women artists
20th-century English painters
Amateur golfers
Artists from Bristol
British women illustrators
English women painters
Medical illustrators
Modern painters